Glomosporium leptideum is a species of fungus belonging to the family Glomosporiaceae.

It is native to Europe and Australia.

References

Ustilaginomycotina